Sir Geoffrey Lionel Bindman KC (Hon) (born 3 January 1933) is a British solicitor specialising in human rights law, and founder of the human rights law firm Bindman & Partners. He has been Chair of the British Institute of Human Rights since 2005. He won The Law Society Gazette Centenary Award for Human Rights in 2003, and was knighted in 2007 for services to human rights. In 2011, he was appointed Queen's Counsel.

Early life
Bindman was born and brought up in Newcastle upon Tyne to a family descended from Jewish immigrants. His father Gerald (1904–1974) was a GP who married Rachael Lena Doberman in 1929. Bindman attended the Royal Grammar School, Newcastle, and then left Oriel College, Oxford, with two degrees in law: a BA (later converted to MA) and a postgraduate Bachelor of Civil Law in 1956, qualifying as a solicitor three years later.

Bindman has a second cousin who owns another law firm, Bindman Solicitors LLP, trading as Bindman & Co, in Whickham, Gateshead. His brother is Professor David Bindman (born 1940), emeritus Durning-Lawrence professor of the history of art at University College London and research fellow at the Hutchins Center for African & African American Research at Harvard University.

Career
He became a legal advisor to the Race Relations Board in 1966, a job he retained for 17 years, also following its merger into the Commission for Racial Equality. He also served as a legal advisor to Amnesty International and represented satirical magazine Private Eye.

Bindman was elected as a Labour councillor for Camden London Borough Council in 1971, representing St John's ward. At the time, he was working for a solicitors' firm in Gray's Inn. Along with his fellow councillors, they funded the establishment of the Camden Community Law Centre. It opened in 1973, and Bindman was the first chairman of its management committee. He did not stand at the subsequent council elections in 1974.

In 1974, Bindman established Bindman & Partners as a firm with the aim of "protecting the rights and freedoms of ordinary people." He has personally acted as lawyer for numerous high-profile people including James Hanratty (executed 1962), Keith Vaz and Jack Straw.

In the late 1980s, Bindman visited South Africa as part of an International Commission of Jurists delegation sent to investigate apartheid and subsequently became editor of a book on the topic, South Africa and the Rule of Law. Bindman also continued his international human rights work, acting as a United Nations observer at the first democratic election in South Africa and representing Amnesty International's interests in the British litigation regarding Augusto Pinochet in the late 1990s.

Bindman was fined £12,000 by the Solicitors Disciplinary Tribunal in 2001 for acting despite having a conflict of interest, as well as for breach of confidentiality. It was remarked at the time that he was the "most eminent" lawyer ever to be brought before such a tribunal.
In 2012, Andrew Hopper QC, who was a leading prosecutor before the Tribunal until 2002, reviewed Bindman's case. He found the main charge was at worst "a 'bare conflict' having no adverse consequence" and said the Tribunal's verdict on its seriousness was "incomprehensible". He also suggested the decision to prosecute and the level of the fine were reactions to Bindman's "robust" defence to the charges against him. Hopper sympathised with the view that Bindman was treated "disproportionately because of his stature in the profession".

Bindmans became a limited liability partnership in 2008, and was renamed Bindmans LLP.

In September 2012, Bindman told BBC Radio 4 he agreed with Desmond Tutu that British prime minister Tony Blair should be prosecuted on the grounds that starting the Iraq War was a "crime of aggression" in breach of the United Nations Charter.

Honours 
Bindman received honorary law doctorates (LLD) from De Montfort University in 2000, and the Kingston University in 2006. He was given the Liberty Award for Lifetime Human Rights Achievement in 1999, and the Centenary Award for Human Rights by The Law Society Gazette in 2003.

Personal life 
Bindman is a patron of Humanists UK (formerly the British Humanist Association). He lists his recreations as "walking, music, book collecting".

In 1961, he married research scientist Lynn Janice Winton. She was formerly a reader in Physiology at University College London.

References

External links
Bindmans LLP

1933 births
Alumni of Oriel College, Oxford
Honorary King's Counsel
English Jews
English solicitors
Knights Bachelor
Lawyers awarded knighthoods
Living people
People from Newcastle upon Tyne
Labour Party (UK) councillors
Councillors in the London Borough of Camden